Consort Xin (26 April 1783 – 26 November 1822), of the Manchu Bordered White Banner Liugiya clan, was a consort of Jiaqing Emperor.

Life

Family background 
Consort Xin was a member of  Manchu Bordered White Banner Liugiya clan. Her personal name wasn't recorded in history.

Father: Benzhi , served as General of Jiangning , commander of Eight Banners in Jiangnan.

 Paternal grandfather: Baozhu, held a title of third class master commandant of light chariot.

One brother: Chenghui, served as literary official .

Qianlong era
Lady Liugiya was born on 26 April 1783.

Jiaqing era 
She entered Forbidden city after the triennial Elegant Women Selection in April 1798. Upon the entry, she was given a title "Noble Lady Xin" . A poem "Swangoose sees through needs" written by the secretary of Inner Court Jilun also mentions Noble Lady Xin. According to the poem, "xin" means "faithful".  In 1808, Noble Lady Xin was promoted to "Concubine Xin". Her residence in the Forbidden City was Yanxi Palace. Concubine Xin remained childless during Jiaqing era.

Daoguang era 
According to the imperial tradition, Concubine Xin was promoted to "Dowager Consort Xin" by Daoguang Emperor in January 1821. Lady Liugiya died on 26 November 1822. She was interred in the Chang Mausoleum in Western Qing tombs.

Titles 
 During the reign of the Qianlong Emperor (r. 1735–1796):
 Lady Liugiya (from 26 April 1783)
 During the reign of the Jiaqing Emperor (r. 1796–1820):
 Noble Lady Xin (from April 1798), sixth rank consort 
 Concubine Xin (from 1808), fifth rank consort 
 During the reign of the Daoguang Emperor (r. 1820–1850):
 Dowager Consort Xin (from January 1821)

In fiction and popular culture 
 Portrayed by Elena Kong in Curse of the Royal Harem as Dowager Consort Xin, Liujia Fuxin (劉佳馥馨)

See also
 Ranks of imperial consorts in China#Qing
 Royal and noble ranks of the Qing dynasty

References

Consorts of the Jiaqing Emperor
1783 births
1822 deaths
Mongolian Bordered White Bannermen